Counter Investigation (French: Contre-enquête) is a 1947 French crime drama film directed by Jean Faurez and starring Lucien Coëdel, Louis Salou and Jany Holt. It was shot at the Studio François 1 in Paris. The film's sets were designed by the art directors Roger Briaucourt and René Moulaert.

Synopsis
A man wrongly accused of murdering his wife escapes from prison just before his execution and goes on the run. He begs the retired gangster Monsieur Charles to launch his own investigation into the crime to uncover the real culprit. He embarks on this mission with the help of his wife Ginette and two former associates.

Cast
 Lucien Coëdel as Monsieur Charles
 Louis Salou as 	Ludovic Bresson dit Paragraphe
 Jany Holt as 	Ginette
 Maurice Teynac as Serge de Souquières
 Abel Jacquin as Alain Marchal
 Paul Frankeur as Teddy Coffre-Fort
 Pierre-Louis as 	Ouverture-Eclair
 Lise Topart as Michèle Marchal
 Marguerite Pierry as 	Tante Brigitte
 Gisèle Préville as 	Odette Marchal
 Marcel André as Le juge d'instruction Nicolas Fournier
 Renée Dennsy as La bonne

References

Bibliography 
 Martin, Yves. Le cinéma français, 1946-1966: un jeune homme au fil des vagues. Editions Méréal, 1998.

External links 
 

1947 films
French crime drama films
1947 crime drama films
1940s French-language films
Films directed by Jean Faurez
1940s French films